The Society of Mary abbreviated SM, commonly known as the Marist Fathers, is a men's Roman Catholic clerical religious congregation of pontifical right. It was founded by Jean-Claude Colin and a group of seminarians in Lyon, France, in 1816. The society's name is derived from the Virgin Mary, whom the members attempt to imitate in their spirituality and daily work. Its members add the nominal letters S.M. after their names to indicate their membership in the congregation.

Foundation (1816–1836)
The idea of a new Marian body to fill the vacuum left by the suppression of the Society of Jesus had been widespread for some time and had arisen also in the post-revolutionary diocese of Lyons. In the diocesan seminaries there, one seminarian, Jean-Claude Courveille (1787–1866), had an initial inspiration regarding the foundation of a specific congregation to be called the "Society of Mary",  but the leading role in bringing the plan to fruition was taken up by Father Jean-Claude Colin, who emerged as the real founder, even though he was the most retiring of the group. The context was in part the fall of Napoleon in 1815 and the restoration of the Bourbon Dynasty, which seemed to offer an opportunity for a revival of the Catholic Church and a return to evangelisation of the increasingly de-Christianized population.

Colin was assigned after ordination to Cerdon where he was assistant to the pastor, his elder brother Pierre. There Jean-Claude began drafting a tentative rule for the group of priests and with Jeanne-Marie Chavoin founded the Sisters of the Holy Name of Mary, later called Marist Sisters. Another member of the same group of former seminarians, the priest Saint Marcellin Champagnat, established at La Valla-en-Gier the Little Brothers of Mary. The reception from the ecclesiastical authorities in Lyon was decidedly cool since the diocese was afraid of losing priests from its control, given the dramatic local needs. For this reason, little progress could be made toward the foundation of the priests' branch as a religious congregation until Cerdon, Colin's parish, passed from the jurisdiction of Lyon Diocese to a revived diocese of Belley. In 1823, Bishop Devie of Belley authorised Colin and a few companions to resign their parish duties and form into a travelling missionary band for the rural districts. Their zeal and success in that difficult work moved the bishop to entrust them also with the conduct of his minor seminary, thus enlarging the scope of their work. However, little progress could be made toward the foundation of a true religious congregation, since like the Lyons authorities, Bishop Devie wanted at most a diocesan institute only, while Fr. Colin was averse to such a limitation. This came near placing the nascent institute in jeopardy.

Missionary needs in Oceania
By the beginning of the 19th century Christian churches were well established in the Americas, Europe, and Australia. Christian evangelization efforts turned to Africa, Asia, and Oceania.  The Holy See, keen to establish the Catholic faith in this area, entrusted its evangelization efforts of Oceania to the Congregation of the Sacred Hearts of Jesus and Mary (Picpus Fathers).  Subsequently the territory was divided, so that the Holy See assigned a Vicariate Apostolic of Eastern Oceania (including Tahiti, the Marquesas, and Hawaii) to the Picpus Fathers, and established a Vicariate Apostolic of Western Oceania (including Micronesia, Melanesia, Fiji, New Zealand, Samoa, and Tonga) which was assigned to the Society of Mary (Marists).

It was as a result of some preliminary contacts with Rome that this missionary task was proposed to the Marists, and upon their acceptance Pope Gregory XVI, by a Brief of April 29, 1836, formally approved the "Priests of the Society of Mary" or Marist Fathers as a religious institute with simple vows and under a Superior General. The Little Brothers of Mary and the Sisters of the Holy Name of Mary, commonly called Marist Brothers and Marist Sisters, were not included but were to be separate institutes. Father Colin was elected Superior General on September 24, 1836, and on that same day the first Marist religious professions took place. Along with Colin the first professed included two who would become saints: Saint Peter Chanel, S.M., martyred on the island of Futuna, and Saint Marcellin Champagnat, S.M., founder of the Marist Brothers.

Early development (1836–1910)

From its definitive organisation the Society of Mary developed in and out of France, along the various lines of its constitutions . In France it did mission work in various centres. When educational liberty was restored to French Catholics, it also entered the field of secondary or "college" education, its methods being embodied in Montfat's "Théorie et pratique de l'education chrétienne" (Paris, 1880). It also assumed the direction of a few diocesan seminaries together with professorships in Catholic universities. The French province also supplied men for the various missions undertaken abroad by the Society of Mary.

Outside France, the first field of labour was the Vicariate Apostolic of Western Oceania, comprising New Zealand, Tonga, Samoa, the Gilbert (now known as Kiribati) and Marshall Islands, Fiji, New Caledonia, New Guinea, the Solomon and the Caroline Islands. Under vicar apostolic Bishop Jean Baptiste Pompallier who took up residence in New Zealand, the Marists successively moved to Wallis in 1837, soon converted by Father Pierre Bataillon; Futuna in 1837, the place of Saint Pierre Chanel's martyrdom; Tonga in 1842; New Caledonia in 1843, where Bishop Douarre, Pompallier's coadjutor, met untold difficulties and Brother Blaise Marmoiton was martyred; and, in spite of much Protestant opposition, Fiji in 1844 and Samoa in 1845. The immense area of the vicariate, together with the presence of a bishop from the diocesan clergy as its head, soon necessitated the creation of smaller districts, headed by Marist bishops: Central Oceania under Bishop Bataillon (1842), Melanesia and Micronesia under Bishop Epalle (1844), New Caledonia under Bishop Douarre (1847), and Wellington (New Zealand) under Bishop Viard (1848). Bishop Pompallier retained Auckland and the Navigator Islands (1851), long administered by the Vicar Apostolic of Central Oceania, along with the Prefecture of Fiji (1863). Of all these, Melanesia and Micronesia had to be abandoned after the murder of Bishop Epalle at Isabella Island and the sudden death of his successor, Bishop Colomb, the Solomon Islands alone reverting to the Marists in 1898. Those various missions have progressed steadily under the Marist Fathers who, besides their religious work, have largely contributed to make known the languages, fauna, and flora of the South Sea Islands. The growth of New Zealand was such as to call for a regular hierarchy, and the Marists were concentrated (1887) in the  Archdiocese of Wellington  and Diocese of Christchurch that were still governed by members of the institute. In Australia they established a base at Hunters Hill in Sydney which supported missionary activity.

Spirituality
The Society of Mary was founded in a time of great turmoil and difficulty for the French clergy and religious institutions. In this time of unrest a strong notion of eschatology arose within the circle of seminarians that would become the first Marists. It was in this atmosphere that the Marian maxim "I (Mary) was the mainstay of the new-born Church; I shall be again at the end of time" began to circulate. The early Marists saw themselves as the ones to live and minister under Mary's name. That was the core of the spiritual understanding of what they saw as their vocation.

Marist spirituality is largely based on the vision of Jean-Claude Colin. A phrase that was central to his understanding of religious life was "Ignoti et quasi occulti in hoc mundo", unknown and partially hidden in this world. For Colin this sentence is exemplary for the way Mary lived the Gospel in a humble, modest, and simple way. The Marists are called to imitate Mary in this way of life and ministry. Colin said Marists must "think as Mary, judge as Mary, feel and act as Mary in all things."

Colin called the missionary and pastoral activity of the Marists the "Work of Mary". According to Marist tradition the Society of Mary as a whole and every individual Marist is called to be an "Instrument of Mercy" for all mankind. As Mary was a healing presence in the Early Church so the Marists want to be present in the Church of their days.

Notable Marist Fathers
The Australian Marist priest Fr Austin Woodbury established the Aquinas Academy, a school of Thomist philosophy for laypeople, in Sydney in 1945 and ran it successfully for thirty years.

The Australian Marist priest Fr Paul Glynn is the author of the best-selling Song for Nagasaki. His brother and fellow Marist priest, Fr Tony Glynn, also worked in Japan and promoted reconciliation between Japan and its former enemies.

The Irish historian, Fr. Brendan Bradshaw, was a Marist Father.  His decision to join the religious institute opened up opportunities for further studies and he then took his first degree at University College, Dublin. It was at this point he moved to Cambridge and undertook graduate research with Prof. Sir Geoffrey Elton. He was a graduate student at Corpus Christi and then had the good fortune to be elected to a Research Fellowship at St John's. Appointment to a University Lectureship followed at Queens' College, Cambridge, in due course.  Certain themes recur in Bradshaw's work: the importance of history and experience for identity, particularly in Ireland; the inadequacies of Whig history; the importance of thorough documentary analysis as the only basis for decent history, although this is coupled with an awareness of the value of literary sources for the historian. For Fr. Bradshaw, the historian, like any other intellectual, has a duty to communicate with society.

The seventh Bishop of Brentwood is Alan Williams, who is an English Marist Father.

St. Peter Julian Eymard who later founded his own religious order Congregation of the Blessed Sacrament

Joel Matthias Konzen, a Marist Brother, has served as an auxiliary bishop of the Archdiocese of Atlanta since 2018.

Other areas

In Great Britain, the Marist foundations began as early as 1850 at the request of Nicholas Cardinal Wiseman, Archbishop of Westminster, but have not grown beyond three colleges and five parishes. In the United States, the Society of Mary took a firmer hold. From Louisiana, whither Archbishop Odin called them in 1863 to take charge of a French parish and college, the Marists passed into eleven states and branched off into Mexico, and, although continuing to minister to a number of French speaking communities, did not limit their action there but took up other ministries and apostolates. They operate the Lourdes Center in Boston, Massachusetts, established in 1950 by Richard Cardinal Cushing and Bishop Pierre-Marie Theas to distribute Lourdes water in the United States.

Today
Today the Society, with its Generalate in Rome, operates in five Provinces: Canada, Europe, New Zealand, Oceania, and USA, along with five mission districts: Africa (Senegal and Cameroun), South America (Brazil and Peru), Asia (The Phillipines and Thailand), Australia and Mexico. The European Provinces, Districts, and Delegations (England, Ireland, France, Germany, Italy, the Netherlands, Spain and Norway) reconfigured in 2008 and formed the new European Province. The Provinces in the United States (Atlanta and Boston) became one Province (USA) on January 1, 2009. There are around 500 Marists worldwide.

Sexual abuse	
	
The Royal Commission of Inquiry into Abuse in Care in New Zealand has yet to publish its findings which is due for publication in June 2023, but a number of cases of sexual abuse of children by members of the Society of Mary have been documented.

See also
Chanel College, Moamoa
Intendencia Oriental y Llanos de San Martín
Apifo'ou College, Tonga

References

External links

Units
The Society of Mary
The Province of New Zealand
The Province of Oceania
The Province of Australia
The Province of the USA
The Province of Europe
The District of Africa
The District of Asia

Marist Youth International
Marist Youth International

History and spirituality
Life and spirituality of Jean-Claude Colin
Foundation Places of the Marist Fathers
Marist Spirituality

Mary, Society of
Religious organizations established in 1816
Catholic religious institutes established in the 19th century
1816 establishments in France